Tales of Us is the sixth concert tour from British band Goldfrapp in support of their sixth studio album, Tales of Us, released in September 2013.

Development
The tour was announced in early June 2013, following the announcement of the release of their new album through their official website. The band announced dates in Europe and Australia. The first concert was a warm up show in Bristol at the Trinity Centre, with 2 further shows at the Albert Hall in Manchester, England as part of the Manchester International Festival and was the premiere of all songs from the new album along with some additional goldfrapp tracks. Also announced was a date at Somerset House as part of the "Summer Series" and 2 festival dates. The tour officially kicked off in Amsterdam in October, 2013.

Band
The band consists of 6 members (including Alison Goldfrapp). These are:

 Alison Goldfrapp – vocals
 Ellie Stanford – violin
 Alex Lee – guitars
 Angie Pollock – keyboards, backing vocals
 Charlie Jones – bass guitar
 Seb Sternberg – drums

Set lists

For the first 5 dates each set list varied. The Manchester shows was a showcase of their new album and included each song from it and a few others specifically from their previous albums Felt Mountain and Seventh Tree. London's Somerset House concert featured a selection of songs from Tales of Us, in addition to tracks from all their previous studio albums – including "Number 1", "You Never Know", "Ooh La La", "Paper Bag", "Shiny and Warm", "Ride a White Horse", "A&E", "Caravan Girl", "Black Cherry", "Train", "Strict Machine" and others.

Main tour set list
The following set list is representative of most dates on the tour.

 Jo
 Drew
 Stranger
 Alvar
 Annabel
 Clay
 Yellow Halo
 Little Bird
 You Never Know
 Thea
 Number One
 Ride A White Horse
 Train
 Utopia
 Clowns
 Lovely Head
 Strict Machine

Reception
The reviews for the tour were extremely positive.

Billboard.com gave a positive review of the Beacon Theatre show in New York City and ended by saying "By the time the entire Beacon stood up for the celebratory finale, "Caravan Girl", it was clear that the magic of Goldfrapp and the orchestra on Tuesday night would be hard to duplicate, even by a likely return to the States in 2014."
The Independent reviewed the Somerset House with 4/5 rating although never criticising the band's new music, they stated "They may find it a challenge touring their delicate new material, but Goldfrapp still put on a heck of a show."

The London Evening Standard reviewed Goldfrapp as part of their sum up of the Lovebox festival in London, by stating "Alison Goldfrapp re-established herself as Madonna's stranger sister and her band brought Lovebox to a thrilling close". At the end of their review they went on to say "None was better than Goldfrapp, who sent the punters home on a high. Without them, this would have felt less like a super Sunday and more like a superfluous one".

Tour dates

Cancelled shows

An Australian Festival Tour was announced in June 2013 but was cancelled on 16 September 2013 due to poor ticket sales of the Harvest Festival. Whilst some of the bands performed a headline tour of Australia instead of the festival, Goldfrapp tweeted that they were unable to tour Australia.

Box score

Critical reception

Reviews for the tour have all been positive. With The Guardian giving the Manchester show 4/5 stars. Similarly, The Independent gave their Somerset House show 4/5 and acknowledged that the delicate new material may be challenging live, but they "still put on one heck of a show."

Sold-out shows
Eight of the 14 shows sold out. Tickets for London's Somerset House concert sold out very quickly.

References

Goldfrapp
2013 concert tours
2014 concert tours